Trichostetha fascicularis is a large, metallic-green beetle found in South Africa.

Description
The Protea Beetle is about 25mm long. It has metallic-green wing cases with a black head and thorax which has two white vertical stripes. It has orange hairs growing around the bottom of its body.

Habitat
It is found in South Africa wherever proteas occur. Adults feed on the pollen and nectar. They live in fynbos, mountainous habitats, and residential gardens if its food supply is available.

Subspecies
T. fascicularis has four subspecies:
Trichostetha fascicularis maraisi Stobbia, 1995
Trichostetha fascicularis natalis Burmeister, 1842
Trichostetha fascicularis nigripennis Allard, 1992
Trichostetha fascicularis prunipennis Burmeister, 1842

References

Cetoniinae
Beetles of Africa
Insects of South Africa
Beetles described in 1805